Gerald Alan Mattinson (born November 6, 1958) is an American retired basketball coach. He was a longtime women's basketball coach at the University of Wyoming, first as an assistant coach from 2003 to 2019 and head coach from 2019 to 2022.

Early life and college career
A football and basketball player in high school, Mattinson graduated from Rock Springs High School in 1977. He then attended and played basketball for Casper College, earning All-American honors in his only season. In 1978, Mattinson transferred to Weber State College (now University) to play for Neil McCarthy. As a senior in 1980–81, Mattinson averaged 8.7 points, 6.2 rebounds, and 1.4 assists. Mattinson earned a bachelor of science degree in business education from Weber State in 1981.

Coaching career

Early coaching career (1981–1999)
Upon graduation, Mattinson served as a graduate assistant for Weber State for one season. He then returned to Rock Springs High in 1982 to become a business education teacher and boys' basketball head coach; he coached the boys' basketball team through 1987. From 1987 to 1999, Mattinson coached at Western Wyoming Community College in many different capacities, starting as men's assistant coach from 1987 to 1990, men's head coach and assistant athletic director from 1991 to 1998, and women's basketball assistant coach from 1998 to 1999.

In 1999, Mattinson paused his basketball coaching career to become principal at East Junior High School in Rock Springs.

Wyoming assistant and head coach (2003–2022)
In 2003, Mattinson became an assistant coach under new head coach Joe Legerski at the University of Wyoming. Mattinson stayed on the staff for the entire 16-year tenure of Legerski, during which Wyoming went 314–186 with eight Women's National Invitation Tournament appearances, including the 2007 title, and an appearance in the 2008 NCAA tournament.

Following Legerski's retirement, Mattinson was promoted to head coach on May 7, 2019 with a three-year contract. Mattinson's debut season as head coach in 2019–20 was 17–12 overall including 12–6 in Mountain West Conference games for a third place tie in conference standings. The following season in 2020–21, Wyoming finished 14–10 (8–8 Mountain West). Entering the Mountain West championship tournament as the no. 7 seed, Wyoming won the tournament with a 59–56 win over no. 4 Fresno State on March 10, 2021. Wyoming appeared in the   2021 NCAA tournament on March 22, the program's first appearance in the tournament since 2008.

In 2021–22, Wyoming finished tied for third in Mountain West standings at 11–6 (15–12 overall). Wyoming advanced to the third round of the 2022 Women's National Invitation Tournament, losing 82–81 to UCLA in triple overtime at home on March 24, 2022.

On March 25, Mattinson announced his retirement from coaching. Mattinson completed his tenure with a 48–35 overall record. Heather Ezell, a longtime Wyoming assistant under both Legerski and Mattinson, was promoted to head coach the same day.

Head coaching record

References

1958 births
Living people
Junior college women's basketball coaches in the United States
Basketball coaches from Wyoming
High school basketball coaches in the United States
Junior college men's basketball coaches in the United States
People from Rock Springs, Wyoming
Weber State Wildcats men's basketball players
Wyoming Cowgirls basketball coaches
American women's basketball coaches
Basketball players from Wyoming